William Covell (died 1613) was an English clergyman and writer.

Life

He was born in Chadderton, Lancashire, England, and proceeded MA at Queens' College, Cambridge in 1588.

In the 1590s Covell took part in the controversy about how far the newly reformed Church of England should abandon the liturgy and hierarchy of the past, to which debate he contributed several broadly anti-puritan works.  In his later career he allied himself with Archbishop John Whitgift and afterwards with his successor, Richard Bancroft, who, like Covell, was Lancashire-born.

William Covell died in 1613 at Mersham, Kent, where he was rector.

Works

Covell's interest to modern scholars now largely depends on one polemical work published in 1595, Polimanteia.  In the course of this work, dedicated to the 2nd Earl of Essex, Covell briefly mentioned contemporary authors such as Thomas Nashe, Samuel Daniel and William Shakespeare.

Covell published in 1603 a religious volume which weighed in on the then-contemporary tension in the Church of England between tradition and puritanism.

References
Stephen Wright, ‘Covell, William (d. 1613)’, Oxford Dictionary of National Biography, Oxford University Press, 2004

Notes

People from Chadderton
English Calvinist and Reformed ministers
Alumni of Queens' College, Cambridge
Year of birth unknown
16th-century births
1613 deaths
17th-century English Anglican priests
16th-century Anglican theologians
17th-century Anglican theologians
Clergy from Lancashire
17th-century English male writers
17th-century English writers
People from Mersham